The 2010 Masters Tournament was the 74th Masters Tournament, played April 8–11 at Augusta National Golf Club. 
Phil Mickelson won his third Masters and fourth major title, three shots ahead of runner-up Lee Westwood.

Field
The Masters has the smallest field of the major championships. Officially the Masters remains an invitation event, but there is now a qualification process. In theory, the club could simply decline to invite a qualified player. This is the list of the 96 players who played in the 2010 Masters Tournament. Each player is classified according to the first category by which he qualified, but other categories are shown in parentheses.

1. Past Masters Champions
Ángel Cabrera (2,11,15,17,18,19), Fred Couples, Ben Crenshaw, Trevor Immelman, Zach Johnson (15,16,17,18,19), Bernhard Langer, Sandy Lyle, Phil Mickelson (4,5,11,12,15,16,17,18,19), Larry Mize, Mark O'Meara, Vijay Singh (18,19), Craig Stadler, Tom Watson (13), Mike Weir (15,17,18,19), Tiger Woods (2,3,4,11,12,14,15,16,17,18,19), Ian Woosnam

(Past champions who did not play: Tommy Aaron, Seve Ballesteros, Jack Burke Jr., Billy Casper, Charles Coody, Nick Faldo, Raymond Floyd, Doug Ford, Bob Goalby, Jack Nicklaus, José María Olazábal, Arnold Palmer, Gary Player, and Fuzzy Zoeller).  Nicklaus joined Palmer as "honorary starters" and teed off on the first day at the first hole to kick off the tournament.

2. Last five U.S. Open Champions
Michael Campbell, Lucas Glover (12,15,17,18,19), Geoff Ogilvy (11,15,16,17,18,19)

3. Last five British Open Champions
Stewart Cink (13,15,17,18,19), Pádraig Harrington (4,15,17,18,19)

4. Last five PGA Champions
Y. E. Yang (14,15,16,17,18,19)

5. Last three of The Players Champions
Sergio García (18,19), Henrik Stenson (18,19)

6. Top two finishers in the 2009 U.S. Amateur
An Byeong-hun (a), Ben Martin (a)

7. Winner of the 2009 Amateur Championship
Matteo Manassero (a)

8. Winner of the 2009 Asian Amateur
Han Chang-won (a)

9. Winner of the 2009 U.S. Amateur Public Links
Brad Benjamin (a)

10. Winner of the 2009 U.S. Mid-Amateur
Nathan Smith (a)

11. The top 16 finishers and ties in the 2009 Masters Tournament
Chad Campbell, Tim Clark (15,18,19), Steve Flesch, Jim Furyk (15,16,17,18,19), Todd Hamilton, Shingo Katayama, Hunter Mahan (12,15,16,17,18,19), John Merrick, Sean O'Hair (15,16,17,18,19), Kenny Perry (15,16,17,18,19), Steve Stricker (15,16,17,18,19), Camilo Villegas (16,18,19)

12. Top 8 finishers and ties in the 2009 U.S. Open
Ricky Barnes, David Duval, Ross Fisher (18,19), Søren Hansen (18,19)

13. Top 4 finishers and ties in the 2009 British Open Championship
Lee Westwood (14,18,19), Chris Wood

14. Top 4 finishers and ties in the 2009 PGA Championship
Rory McIlroy (18,19)

15. Top 30 leaders on the 2009 PGA Tour official money earnings list
Paul Casey (18,19), Brian Gay (16,17,18), Retief Goosen (17,18,19), Dustin Johnson (16,17,19), Jerry Kelly (16,17), Matt Kuchar (19), Justin Leonard (18), Kevin Na (17,19), Ian Poulter (16,18,19), John Rollins, Rory Sabbatini (16), John Senden (17), David Toms (17,18), Nick Watney (17,18,19)

16. Winners of PGA Tour events that award a full-point allocation for the season-ending Tour Championship, between the 2009 Masters Tournament and the 2010 Masters Tournament
Ben Crane, Ernie Els (17,18,19), Nathan Green, Bill Haas, Anthony Kim (18,19), Ryan Moore, Ryan Palmer, Heath Slocum (17)

17. All players qualifying for the 2009 edition of The Tour Championship
Luke Donald (18,19), Jason Dufner, Marc Leishman, Steve Marino, Scott Verplank

18. Top 50 on the final 2009 Official World Golf Rankings list
Robert Allenby (19), Ben Curtis, Simon Dyson, Anders Hansen, Yuta Ikeda (19), Ryo Ishikawa (19), Miguel Ángel Jiménez (19), Robert Karlsson (19), Martin Kaymer (19), Søren Kjeldsen, Graeme McDowell (19), Edoardo Molinari (19), Francesco Molinari (19), Adam Scott, Oliver Wilson (19)
(Michael Sim (19) withdrew prior to the tournament with a shoulder injury)

19. Top 50 on the Official World Golf Rankings list going into the tournament
K. J. Choi, Louis Oosthuizen, Álvaro Quirós, Charl Schwartzel, Thongchai Jaidee

20. International invitees
None

Par 3 Contest
Louis Oosthuizen won the contest with a 6 under par 21. There were 2 holes in one during the contest, both on the 9th hole, achieved by Graeme McDowell and Jim Furyk. McDowell went on to win the U.S. Open, Oosthuizen went on to win The Open Championship, and Furyk went on to win the 2010 FedEx Cup.

Round summaries

First round
Thursday, April 8, 2010

The day started very sunny, but clouds began accumulating later in the morning and thunderstorms were expected in the afternoon; however, the weather remained fair. The much anticipated return of Tiger Woods came on Thursday, who shot a 4-under 68. This was a good opening for Woods, who had never before shot a first round in the 60s at the Masters. But the story of the day was the two Champions Tour players, 60-year-old Tom Watson and 50-year-old Fred Couples, who shot 67 and 66 respectively. Major champions Phil Mickelson and Y.E. Yang were one stroke back of leader Couples along with Lee Westwood, K. J. Choi, and Watson.

Second round
Friday, April 9, 2010

Phil Mickelson shot a 1-under 71 despite missing a 1-foot putt on Hole 5. Fred Couples and Tom Watson both fell back after solid opening rounds. Englishmen Lee Westwood and Ian Poulter shared the lead heading into the weekend.

Amateurs: Manassero (+3), Smith (+5), Benjamin (+6), An (+11), Han (+11), Martin (+11).

Third round
Saturday, April 10, 2010

Lee Westwood continued his solid play in the third round to stay in the lead. Phil Mickelson shot a 67, including a dramatic eagle-eagle-birdie on 13, 14 and 15, to move into second place, three strokes clear of the rest of the field.

Final round
Sunday, April 11, 2010

Summary
Fred Couples mounted an early charge up the leaderboard with two birdies in his first three holes, but he quickly cooled off and ended up in sixth place. Overnight leader Lee Westwood started erratically, while Phil Mickelson parred his first seven holes. K. J. Choi was briefly tied for the lead at -12 with a birdie at 10 but he eventually fell back to a tie for fourth with playing partner Tiger Woods (they were paired together for all four rounds of the tournament). Twenty-four-year-old Anthony Kim shot a blistering 65, including a -5 run over four holes; he finished third. But down the stretch, Mickelson pulled away from Westwood with a bogey-free round of 67 to win the tournament.

Final leaderboard

 Final bulletin - 2010 prize money

Scorecard

Cumulative tournament scores, relative to par
{|class="wikitable" span = 50 style="font-size:85%;
|-
|style="background: Red;" width=10|
|Eagle
|style="background: Pink;" width=10|
|Birdie
|style="background: PaleGreen;" width=10|
|Bogey
|style="background: Green;" width=10|
|Double bogey
|}
Source:

References

External links

Coverage from the PGA of America
Coverage on the European Tour's official site

2010
2010 in golf
2010 in American sports
2010 in sports in Georgia (U.S. state)
April 2010 sports events in the United States